The U11 line is a planned line of the Berlin U-Bahn.

It was featured in the Berlin city transport development plan (StEP) in 1995 and the zoning of 2004 and 2009 as a route control system.

Several tram lines are already running to the parallel route (M5, M6, M8, 16) and the plans were cancelled.

The U11 would connect the eastern districts of Berlin to Berlin Hauptbahnhof. It would comprise extend 15.8 kilometers, with 21 stations, which are: 
 Berlin Hauptbahnhof (ICE, IC, RB, RE, InterConnex, Harz-Berlin-Express, S5, S7, S75, U55)
 Naturkundemuseum (U6)
 Berlin Nordbahnhof (S1, S2, S25)
 Rosenthaler Platz (U8)
 Rosa-Luxemburg-Platz (U2)
 Mollstraße
 Platz der Vereinten Nationen
 Langenbeckstraße
 Landsberger Allee (S41, S42, S8, S85, S9)
 Franz-Jacob-Straße
 Weißenseer Weg
 Vulkanstraße
 Genslerstraße
 Arendsweg
 Rhinstraße
 Bürknersfelde (possible transition to the S-Bahn)
 Marzahn (S7)
 Marzahner Promenade
 Ringenwalder Straße
 Glambecker Ring.

References

Berlin U-Bahn lines